The 2021 BYU Cougars football team represented Brigham Young University in the 2021 NCAA Division I FBS football season. The Cougars were led by sixth-year head coach Kalani Sitake and played their home games at LaVell Edwards Stadium. This was the eleventh year BYU competed as an NCAA Division I FBS independent. The Cougars finished with 10 wins for the second year in a row.

Before the season

Previous season
In an unprecedented season deeply impacted by the COVID-19 pandemic, the Cougars finished the 2020 season 11–1. This was BYU's first 11-win season since 2009, and their first one-loss season since 1996. They finished the season ranked No. 11 in both the AP and Coaches Poll Top 25. The team finished highly ranked in both offensive and defensive numbers. Quarterback Zach Wilson, offensive lineman Brady Christensen, and wide receiver Dax Milne all opted to forego their senior seasons and leave early for the NFL Draft.

Wilson became the highest draft pick in program history when he was selected second overall by the New York Jets. Christensen was selected in the third round by the Carolina Panthers, while Milne and two seniors, nose tackle Khyiris Tonga and defensive back Chris Wilcox, were each selected in the seventh round by the Washington Football Team, Chicago Bears, and Tampa Bay Buccaneers, respectively. Seven other players signed undrafted free agent contracts with NFL teams. The five players selected marked the most in program history since 2002.

Coaching changes
On January 4, 2021 it was announced that Jeff Grimes had accepted a job with Baylor University as the offensive coordinator. Offensive line coach Eric Mateos followed Grimes to Baylor. Aaron Roderick, previously serving as the passing game coordinator and quarterbacks coach under Grimes, was promoted to offensive coordinator for the Cougars. Wide receivers coach Fesi Sitake was then promoted to passing game coordinator. Both Roderick and Sitake will retain their roles as position coaches for the quarterbacks and wide receivers, respectively.

On February 4, 2021 it was announced that Kevin Clune had accepted a job as the linebackers coach for the Cougars. With the new hire Ed Lamb shifted to coach the safeties on the defensive side of the ball, Preston Hadley to the defensive ends/Hybrids and Ilaisa Tuiaki to interior defensive line.

On February 5, 2021 it was announced that Darrell Funk had accepted a job as the offensive line coach for the Cougars.

2021 recruits

2020 returned missionaries

2021 other additions

2021 departures

Schedule

Rankings

NuSkin BYU Sports Network
The NuSkin BYU Sports Network is owned and operated by BYU Radio and features the talents of Greg Wrubell (play-by-play), Riley Nelson (analyst), Mitchell Juergens (reporter/sideline analyst), and Jason Shepherd (host) for the third consecutive year, with Ben Bagley subbing in for Jason Shepherd when he has women's soccer or men's basketball broadcasts. The network is in charge of producing and broadcasting all BYU Football pre and post game shows as well as coaches shows and live broadcasts.

Affiliates

BYU Radio- Flagship Station Nationwide (Dish Network 980, Sirius XM 143, KBYU 89.1 FM HD 2, TuneIn radio, and byuradio.org)
KSL 102.7 FM and 1160 AM- (Salt Lake City / Provo, Utah and ksl.com)
KSNA- Blackfoot / Idaho Falls / Pocatello / Rexburg, Idaho (games)
KSPZ- Blackfoot / Idaho Falls / Pocatello / Rexburg, Idaho (coaches' shows)
KMXD- Monroe / Manti, Utah
KSVC- Richfield / Manti, Utah
KDXU- St. George, Utah

Personnel

Coaching staff

Roster

Depth chart

Game summaries

Vegas Kickoff: Arizona

Sources:

Uniform combination: royal helmets, royal jersey, royal pants w/ white accents

No. 21 Utah

Sources:

Uniform combination: white helmets, royal jersey w/ white stripes, white pants w/ royal accents

No. 19 Arizona State

Sources:

Uniform combination: white helmets, white jersey w/ royal stripes, white pants w/ royal accents

USF

Sources:

Uniform combination: white helmets, navy jersey w/ white stripes, white pants w/ navy accents

Utah State

Sources:

Uniform combination: white helmets, white jersey w/ royal stripes, royal pants w/ white accents

Boise State

Sources:

Uniform combination: navy helmets, navy jersey w/ white stripes, navy pants w/ white accents

Baylor

Sources:

Uniform combination: navy helmets, white jersey w/ navy stripes, navy pants w/ white accents

Washington State

Sources:

Uniform combination: white helmets, white jersey w/ navy stripes, white pants w/ navy accents

Virginia

Sources:

Uniform combination: royal helmets, royal jersey w/ white stripes, white pants w/ royal accents

Senior Day: Idaho State

Sources:

Uniform combination: navy helmets, navy jersey w/ white stripes, white pants w/ navy accents

Georgia Southern

Sources:

Uniform combination: royal helmets, white jersey w/ royal stripes, white pants w/ royal accents

USC

Sources:

Uniform combination: royal helmets, white jersey w/ royal stripes, royal pants w/ white accents

Independence Bowl: UAB

Sources:

Uniform combination: navy helmets, navy jersey w/ white stripes, white pants w/ navy accents

References

BYU
BYU Cougars football seasons
BYU Cougars football